Love Under the Date-Tree (Erotas sti hourmadia) is a 1990 Greek comedy film directed by Stavros Tsiolis. The film was selected as the Greek entry for the Best Foreign Language Film at the 63rd Academy Awards, but was not accepted as a nominee.

Cast
 Argyris Bakirtzis as Panagiotis
 Lazaros Andreou as Giannis
 Dora Masklavanou
 Vina Asiki as Filitsa

See also
 List of submissions to the 63rd Academy Awards for Best Foreign Language Film
 List of Greek submissions for the Academy Award for Best Foreign Language Film

References

External links
 

1991 films
1990 comedy films
1990 films
Greek comedy films
1990s Greek-language films
1991 comedy films